This is an article about treating in the sense of provision of food, drink, and refreshments for a person or group of people. For treating in the context of social dating, see treating (dating).

Treating is the act of serving food, drink, and other refreshments in order to influence people and to gain benefits not easily obtained in the free market.  It began as a political term, and came to be used elsewhere. 

In law and politics, treating is the act of serving food, drink, and other refreshments to influence people for political gain, often shortly before an election. In various countries, treating is considered a form of corruption, and is illegal as such.  However, as long as the supplying of refreshments is not part of a quid pro quo for votes, etc., it is often not illegal.

References

See also
Bribery
Electoral fraud

Political corruption
Electoral fraud